United Nations Security Council Resolution 438, adopted on October 23, 1978, after reaffirming previous resolutions, considered a report by the Secretary-General regarding the United Nations Emergency Force and noted the discussions the Secretary-General had with all the concerned parties to the Middle East situation.

The Council expressed its concern over the continuing tension in the area and decided to:

(a) To renew the mandate of the United Nations Disengagement Observer Force for another year, until July 24, 1979;
(b) To request the Secretary-General to keep the Security Council to publish a report on the progress made at the end of this period;
(c) To call upon all parties to immediately implement resolution 338 (1973).

The resolution was adopted by 12 votes to none; Czechoslovakia and the Soviet Union abstained from voting. China did not participate in the vote.

See also
 Arab–Israeli conflict
 Egypt–Israel relations
 List of United Nations Security Council Resolutions 401 to 500 (1971–1976)

References
Text of the Resolution at undocs.org

External links
 

 0438
 0438
Middle East peace efforts
 0438
October 1978 events